Surrey County Council is elected every four years and was made in 1889 under the Local Government Act 1888.  Since 1965 this council has had one of two statuses as to its body of councillors: no overall political control, or overall Conservative party control.

Political context

Its area was significantly altered in 1965, taking much of its north into Greater London and adding an area forming one present district from Middlesex which was dissolved.

Since 1974 all Surrey areas have had district/borough councils providing a second tier of services (see the Local Government Act 1972) replacing Urban Districts and Rural Districts.

Approximately a third of the population elect a further more localised third tier of local government to civil parishes such as Farnham, Claygate and Horley.

Major services provided include social services, minerals strategy and permissions, waste planning and substantial elements of transport (excluding railways) and education. The county has no grammar schools (which tend to have less local authority control) however academies and free schools in the 21st century have been set up in Surrey meaning a lower proportion of schools are run by the authority than in the 20th century.

Political control

Leadership
The leaders of the council since 1997 have been:

Composition since 1965

Council elections
 
1977 Surrey County Council election
2009 Surrey County Council election
2013 Surrey County Council election
2017 Surrey County Council election
2021 Surrey County Council election

The number of electoral divisions on Surrey County Council was increased to 76, in time for the 1981 election.

The number of electoral divisions on Surrey County Council was increased from 76 to 80, in time for the 2005 election.

2009 Surrey County Council election

2013 Surrey County Council election

The number of electoral divisions on Surrey County Council was increased from 80 to 81, in time for the 2013 election.

2017 Surrey County Council election

2021 Surrey County Council election

County result maps

By-election results

References

External links
Surrey County Council

 
Council elections in Surrey
County council elections in England